This is a list of women artists who were born in Slovenia or whose artworks are closely associated with that country.

B
Suzana Bricelj (born 1971), painter, illustrator

D
Julia Doria (active since 2004), writer, illustrator

G
Alenka Gerlovič (1919–2010), painter 
Jelka Godec Schmidt (born 1958), illustrator, children's writer
Ančka Gošnik Godec (born 1927), illustrator, children's writer
Tjaša Iris (born 1968), painter

J
Marjanca Jemec Božič (born 1928), illustrator

K
Irena Kazazić (born 1972), painter, writer
Ivana Kobilca (1861–1926), prominent Slovene woman painter
Juta Krulc (1913–2015), landscape architect and artist

M
Adriana Maraž (1931–2015), graphic artist

N
Lela B. Njatin (born 1963), writer, visual artist

O
Mojca Osojnik (born 1970), painter, illustrator
Lidija Osterc (1928–2006), painter, illustrator

P
Roža Piščanec (1923–2006), painter, illustrator
Cita Potokar (1915–1993), painter, illustrator
Marjetica Potrč (born 1953), artist, architect
Lila Prap (born 1955), illustrator

R
Jelka Reichman (born 1939), painter, illustrator
Miranda Rumina (active since 1980s), multimedia artist, writer

S
Alenka Sottler (born 1958), painter, illustrator
Marija Lucija Stupica (1950–2002), illustrator
Marlenka Stupica (1927–2022), prominent illustrator

V
Eka Vogelnik (born 1946), illustrator, costume designer, puppeteer
Kamila Volčanšek (born 1950), painter, illustrator
Melita Vovk (1928–2020), painter, illustrator

Z
Vlasta Zorko (born 1934), sculptor
 

-
Slovenian
Artists, women
Artists